Ulanga is a village in Mbarali District, Mbeya Region of southwestern Tanzania. It is in the outwash plain of the Njamkala River.

Notes

Populated places in Mbeya Region